Johannes Janssen (10 April 1829 – 24 December 1891) was a Catholic priest and German historian born in Xanten. After graduating from the Rektoratsschule in Xanten (today's Stiftsgymnasium), he was educated at the universities of Münster, Leuven, Bonn and Berlin, afterwards becoming a teacher of history in Frankfurt-am-Main.

He was ordained priest in 1860, became a member of the Prussian House of Deputies in 1875, and in 1880 was made domestic prelate to the pope and apostolic pronotary. He died at Frankfurt. Janssen was a stout champion of the Ultramontane party in the Roman Catholic Church.

Works
His great work is his Geschichte des deutschen Volkes seit dem Ausgang des Mittelalters (8 vols., Freiburg, 1878–1894). He argues against Luther, Zwingli and the other Protestant reformers Reformation, and claims that Protestantism was responsible for the general unrest in Germany during the 16th and 17th centuries. The author's conclusions led to some controversy, and Janssen wrote An meine Kritiker (Freiburg, 1882) and Ein zweites Wort an meine Kritiker (Freiburg, 1883) in reply to the Janssens Geschichte des deutschen Volkes (Munich, 1883) of Max Lenz, and other criticisms.

The Geschichte, which has passed through numerous editions, has been continued and improved by Ludwig Pastor, and the greater part of it has been translated into English by M. A. Mitchell and A. M. Christie (London, 1896, fol.). Of his other works perhaps the most important are: the editing of Frankfurts Reichskorrespondenz, 1376–1519 (Freiburg, 1863–1872); and of the Leben, Briefe und kleinere Schriften of his friend JF Böhmer (Leipzig, 1868); a monograph, Schiller als Historiker (Freiburg, 1863); and Zeit- und Lebensbilder (Freiburg, 1875).

Works in English translation
 History of the German People at the close of the Middle Ages, Kegan Paul, Trench, Trübner & Co, Ltd. (1896-1910):
 Vol. I: Popular Education and Science – Art and Popular Literature – Political Economy, 1896.
 Vol. II. The Holy Roman Empire, 1896.
 Vol III: The Revolution Party and its Proceedings – The Diet of Worms and the Progress of the Politico-Clerical Revolution, 1900.
 Vol. IV: The Social Revolution, 1900.
 Vol. V: Propagation and Systematising of the New Doctrines – Plan of War Against the Emperor – The League of Smalcald – The Zwinglian Religious Disturbance in Suabia – Fresh Overtures of Peace from the Emperor, 1903.
 Vol. VI: The Smalcaldian War and Internal Disintegration Down to the So-Called Religious Peace of Nuremberg, 1912.
 Vol. VII: General Conditions of the German People from the So-Called Religious Pacification of Augsburg in 1555 to the Proclamation of the Formula of Concord in 1580, 1905.
 Vol. VIII: General Conditions of the German People from the So-Called Religious Pacification of Augsburg in 1555 to the Proclamation of the Formula of Concord in 1580 (Cont.),1905.
 Vol. IX: The Politico-Religious Revolution from the Proclamation of the Formula of Concord in 1580 up to the Year 1608, 1906.
 Vol. X: Leading up to the Thirty Years' War, 1906.
 Vol. XI: Art and Popular Literature to the Beginning of the Thirty Years' War, 1907.
 Vol. XII: Art and Popular Literature to the Beginning of the Thirty Years' War, (Cont.), 1907.
 Vol. XIII: Schools and Universities, Science, Learning and Culture Down to the Beginning of the Thirty Years' War, 1909.
 Vol. XIV: Schools and Universities, Science, Learning and Culture Down to the Beginning of the Thirty Years' War (Cont.), 1909.
 Vol. XV: Commerce and Capital – Private Life of Different Classes – Mendicancy and Poor Relief, 1910.
 Vol. XVI: General Moral and Religious Corruption – Imperial Legislation Against Witchcraft – With Persecution from the Time of the Church Schism to the Last Third of the Sixteenth Century, 1910.
 Index Volume, Kegan Paul, Trench, Trübner & Co, Ltd., 1925.

Gallery

See also
 Karl Gotthard Lamprecht
 Ludwig von Pastor
 Leopold von Ranke

References
 Alexander, Joseph (1892). "Johannes Janssen," The Catholic World, Vol. LV, pp. 572–579.
 Duhr, Bernard (1930). "Johannes Janssem als Katholiseher Historiker," Der Katholische Gedanke, Vol. III, No. 3.
 Jedin, Hubert (1974). "Janssen, Johannes". In: Neue Deutsche Biographie. Berlin: Duncker & Humblot.
 Meister, Franz (1896). Erinnerung an Johannes Janssen. Frankfort: A. Foesser Nachf.
 Mooney, John A. (1887). "Professor Janssen and other Modern German Historians," The American Catholic Quarterly Review, Vol. XII, pp. 424–451.
 Mooney, John A. (1888). "Johannes Janssen, Germany's Great Historian," The American Catholic Quarterly Review, Vol. XIII, pp. 429–462.
 Pastor, Ludwig von (1893). Johannes Janssen. Freiburg: Herder.
 Pastor, Ludwig von (1905). "Janssen, Johannes". In: Allgemeine Deutsche Biographie. Leipzig: Duncker & Humblot, pp. 733–741.
 Schwann, Mathieu (1892). Johannes Janssen und die Geschichte der deutschen Reformation. München: C. Mehrlich.
 Thompson, James Westfall (1942). "Catholic Historians." In: A History of Historical Writing.  The Macmillan Company, pp. 535–558.
 Wildermuth, Bernd (1990). "Johannes Janssen". In: Biographisch-Bibliographisches Kirchenlexikon. Hamm: Bautz.

External links
 Catholic Encyclopedia: Johann Janssen

1829 births
1891 deaths
19th-century German historians
German Roman Catholics
People from Xanten
People from the Rhine Province
Prussian politicians
University of Münster alumni
University of Bonn alumni
Humboldt University of Berlin alumni
Burials at Frankfurt Main Cemetery
19th-century German male writers
German male non-fiction writers